Copelatus biswasi is a species of diving beetle. It is part of the genus Copelatus in the subfamily Copelatinae of the family Dytiscidae. It was described by Mukherjee & Sengupta in 1986.

References

biswasi
Beetles described in 1986